Carlo Carpioni was an Italian painter. He was the son of Giulio Carpioni. He was born about the middle of the 17th century. He was educated by his father, after whose style he painted a few pictures, but he is better known by his portraits. In the Council-chamber at Vicenza and in the convent of the Servîtes at Monte Berico there are some groups of portraits of magistrates, which show an ingenious and elevated imagination.

References

People from Vicenza
17th-century Italian painters
Italian male painters
Italian Baroque painters
Year of death unknown
Year of birth unknown